Herberto Helder de Oliveira (Funchal, São Pedro, 23 November 1930 – Cascais, 23 March 2015) was a Portuguese poet often considered the most important Portuguese poet of the second half of the 20th century.

Biography 
Herberto Helder was born in the Portuguese Atlantic island of Madeira. In 1946 he traveled to Lisbon to complete his secondary studies and subsequently in 1948 moved to Coimbra to study Law at university. In 1949 he had changed to the Humanities University to study Romance Philology but dropped out after three years without completing the course. After returning to Lisbon he took up several temporary jobs, and got in contact with a circle of artists and writers such as Mário Cesariny, Luiz Pacheco, João Vieira and Hélder Macedo. This group revolved around Surrealism which would inform his early writings. In 1958 his first book, O Amor em Visita was published. In the following years he traveled and lived in France, Holland and Belgium taking menial jobs to survive.

In 1994, he was the winner of the Pessoa Prize, which he refused, saying "Don't tell anyone and give the prize to someone else ..."

Works 
Herberto Helder's poetry and fiction is very visual, and has connections with Surrealism, still his style is difficult to define; he was a practitioner of experimental poetry and some call him an orphic or visionary poet (that somehow reminds Ezra Pound).

Considered one of the most important contemporary Portuguese poets his poetry is not yet enough studied by academics due to the obscurity of his personality itself (he refused to take literary prizes or have media exposure) and the complexity of his paradoxal work that has a strange enchantment.

Published works

Poetry 
 O Amor em visita (Love in visit), Lisbon, 1958
 A Colher na Boca (The spoon in the mouth), Lisbon, 1961
Poemacto (Poemact), Lisbon, 1967
Lugar (Place), Lisbon, 1962
Electronicolirica (Electronicalyrics), Lisbon, 1964
Húmus (Humus), Lisbon, 1967
Retrato em movimento (Portrait in movement), Lisbon, 1967
O bebedor nocturno (The nocturnal drinker), Lisbon, 1968
O ofício cantante (The singing craft), Lisbon, 1968
Cobra (Snake/Cobra), Lisbon, 1977
Photomaton e Vox (Photomaton and Vox), Lisbon, 1979
Poesia Toda (All Poetry), Lisbon, 1981
A Cabeça entre as mãos (The head between the hands), Lisbon, 1982
 As Magias (1987)
 Última Ciência (1988)
 Do Mundo (1994)
 Poesia Toda (1º vol. de 1953 a 1966; 2º vol. de 1963 a 1971) (1973)
 Poesia Toda (1ª ed. em 1981)
 A Faca Não Corta o Fogo – Súmula & Inédita (2008)
 Ofício Cantante (2009)
 Servidões (2013)
 A Morte sem Mestre (2014)
 Poemas canhotos (2015) - Finished just before his death, published two months after the author's death.

Fiction 
Os passos em volta (The steps around), Lisbon, 1963
Apresentação do rosto (Presentation of the face), Lisbon, 1968

References
4. Herberto Helder, in memoriam- Revista Palavra Comum

1930 births
Portuguese male poets
University of Lisbon alumni
University of Coimbra alumni
People from Funchal
Pessoa Prize winners
2015 deaths
20th-century Portuguese poets
21st-century Portuguese writers
21st-century Portuguese poets
20th-century male writers
21st-century male writers